Jonathan Clauss (born 25 September 1992) is a French professional footballer who plays as a right-back for Ligue 1 club Marseille and the France national team.

Early life
Clauss was born in Troyes, Aube.

Club career

Early career
A long-term academy product of Strasbourg, Clauss spent years in the lower divisions of France and Germany before signing a contract with Quevilly-Rouen in the Ligue 2 for the 2017–18 season. He made his professional debut for the club in a 3–2 loss to Châteauroux on 8 September 2017, in which he assisted one of his side's goals.

Arminia Bielefeld
In August 2018, free agent Clauss joined 2. Bundesliga side Arminia Bielefeld after trialling with the side.

Lens
In May 2020, L'Équipe reported Clauss would be leaving Bielefeld upon expiration of his contract in the summer and return to France having agreed a three-year contract with Lens, newly promoted to Ligue 1. At the age of 28, he made the first top-flight appearance of his career. At the end of the 2020–21 season, he was included in the Ligue 1 Team of the Year by the Union Nationale des Footballeurs Professionels (UNFP).

Marseille
On 20 July 2022, Clauss signed with fellow Ligue 1 side Marseille. The transfer fee to be paid to Lens was €9 million.

International career
In March 2022, at the age of 29, Clauss received his first call-up to the France national team when manager Didier Deschamps selected him for friendly matches against Ivory Coast and South Africa. He made his debut on 25 March in a 2–1 victory over the former side.

Career statistics

Club

International

Honours
Arminia Bielefeld
2. Bundesliga: 2019–20

Individual
UNFP Ligue 1 Team of the Year: 2020–21, 2021–22

References

External links

 
 
 

1992 births
Living people
Footballers from Grand Est
Sportspeople from Troyes
French footballers
Association football defenders
RC Strasbourg Alsace players
ASPV Strasbourg players
US Raon-l'Étape players
US Avranches players
US Quevilly-Rouen Métropole players
Arminia Bielefeld players
RC Lens players
Olympique de Marseille players
2. Bundesliga players
Ligue 1 players
Ligue 2 players
Championnat National players
Championnat National 2 players
Championnat National 3 players
French expatriate footballers
Expatriate footballers in Germany
French expatriate sportspeople in Germany